Danae is a genus of handsome fungus beetles in the family Endomychidae. There are more than 90 species in Danae, 1 found in North America, about 10 in Asia, and the remainder in Africa.

Species
These 97 species belong to the genus Danae:

 Danae abdominalis Weise, 1903 - Kenya, Tanzania, Uganda
 Danae aetha Strohecker, 1962 - Congo, DR Congo, Ghana
 Danae algoensis (Gorham, 1905 - South Africa
 Danae androgyna Strohecker, 1974 - DR Congo, Mozambique, South Africa, Tanzania, Zambia
 Danae antennata Strohecker, 1962 - DR Congo
 Danae armata Arrow, 1920 - Congo, DR Congo, Ghana, Malawi, Nigeria
 Danae arrowi Strohecker, 1952 - DR Congo
 Danae ascipes Strohecker, 1957 - Congo
 Danae atrimembris Pic, 1946 - Kenya
 Danae atronotata Pic, 1922 - Cambodia
 Danae attenuatus Strohecker, 1962 - DR Congo
 Danae augusticlava Strohecker, 1953 - Congo
 Danae babaulti Pic, 1922 - Kenya, Tanzania, Uganda
 Danae borneensis Strohecker, 1979 - Borneo
 Danae brevicollis Strohecker, 1959 - DR Congo, Tanzania
 Danae bulbifera Weise, 1903 - Rwanda, Tanzania
 Danae calcarata Arrow, 1936 - South Africa
 Danae capnicera Strohecker, 1953 - Congo, DR Congo
 Danae caprella Strohecker, 1949 - DR Congo
 Danae castanea Sasaji, 1978 - Japan
 Danae cavicollis Arrow, 1920 - DR Congo, South Africa, Zimbabwe
 Danae chappuisi Pic, 1946 - Kenya
 Danae chinensis Strohecker, 1951
 Danae ciliatipes Arrow, 1920 - Myanmar
 Danae clauda Arrow, 1925 - India
 Danae compressa Strohecker, 1960 - DR Congo, Ghana, Uganda
 Danae compsa Strohecker, 1962 - DR Congo
 Danae cordicornis Strohecker, 1959 - DR Congo, Tanzania
 Danae curvicrus Strohecker, 1953 - Congo, DR Congo
 Danae curvipes Arrow, 1920 - Congo, DR Congo, Malawi
 Danae cylindrica Strohecker, 1952 - DR Congo
 Danae damnifica Strohecker, 1952 - DR Congo
 Danae denticornis (Gorham, 1873) - Japan
 Danae dentipes Arrow, 1920 - Zimbabwe
 Danae difficilis Strohecker, 1952 - DR Congo
 Danae diversicornis Pic, 1945 - Kenya, Tanzania, Uganda
 Danae elgonensis Pic, 1946 - Kenya
 Danae elliptica Strohecker, 1957 - Ethiopia
 Danae exhauriens Strohecker, 1955 - Rwanda
 Danae femoralis Arrow, 1920 - Malawi
 Danae foveata Strohecker, 1953 - Congo
 Danae foveicornis Strohecker, 1957 - Kenya, Tanzania, Uganda
 Danae gazella Strohecker, 1973 - Congo, DR Congo
 Danae gestroi Strohecker, 1967 - Congo
 Danae globifera Strohecker, 1953 - Congo
 Danae goffarti Pic, 1945 - Burundi, DR Congo, Rwanda
 Danae gracilis Strohecker, 1952 - DR Congo
 Danae gracillima Strohecker, 1968 - Côte d'Ivoire
 Danae heliobleta Strohecker, 1953 - Congo
 Danae hirsutipes Strohecker, 1979 - Borneo
 Danae incerta Strohecker, 1962 - DR Congo, Ghana
 Danae incisa Strohecker, 1962 - DR Congo
 Danae indefinita Strohecker, 1957 - Congo
 Danae jeanneli Pic, 1946 - Kenya
 Danae jucunda Arrow, 1936 - Ethiopia
 Danae latipes Strohecker, 1954 - DR Congo
 Danae leona Strohecker, 1962 - DR Congo
 Danae longa Strohecker, 1957 - Kenya
 Danae longicornis Arrow, 1920 - South Africa
 Danae longipennis Strohecker, 1953 - Congo
 Danae macra Strohecker, 1952 - DR Congo
 Danae masculina Strohecker, 1957 - DR Congo, Uganda
 Danae microdera Arrow, 1936 - Sudan
 Danae natalensis (Gerstaecker, 1858) - South Africa, Zimbabwe
 Danae nigrosignata Strohecker, 1944 - Java
 Danae nimbensis Villiers, 1954 - DR Congo
 Danae orientalis (Gorham, 1873) - Japan
 Danae ornata Arrow, 1925 - India
 Danae ovata Arrow, 1948 - DR Congo, Ghana, Zimbabwe
 Danae parallela Strohecker, 1959 - DR Congo, Kenya, Tanzania
 Danae parvicornis Strohecker, 1952 - DR Congo
 Danae parvidens Strohecker, 1953 - Congo, Rwanda
 Danae pulchella Gestro, 1895 - Kenya, Tanzania, Uganda
 Danae pusilla Strohecker, 1957 - Kenya
 Danae pygmaea Strohecker, 1957 - Congo
 Danae recta Strohecker, 1973 - Congo, DR Congo
 Danae ruficornis Pic, 1945 - Congo, Kenya, Zimbabwe
 Danae rufipes Pic, 1946 - Kenya
 Danae rufula Reiche, 1847 - Ethiopia
 Danae seminicornis Strohecker, 1952 - DR Congo
 Danae senegalensis (Gerstaecker, 1858) - Benin, DR Congo, Malawi, Senegal
 Danae sericea Arrow, 1925 - India
 Danae shibatai Nakane, 1958 - Japan
 Danae sibutensis Pic, 1921 - Central African Republic
 Danae similis Weise 1903 - South Africa
 Danae simplex Strohecker, 1962 - DR Congo
 Danae subcurvipes Pic, 1946 - Kenya
 Danae taiwana Chûjô, 1938 - Taiwan
 Danae testacea (Ziegler, 1845) - Canada, United States
 Danae tibialis Arrow, 1920 - Kenya, Malawi
 Danae tournieri Villiers, 1954 - DR Congo
 Danae trigona Strohecker, 1962 - DR Congo
 Danae turneri Arrow, 1948 - South Africa
 Danae uelensis Strohecker, 1974 - DR Congo
 Danae valga Strohecker, 1952 - DR Congo
 Danae venustula Gestro, 1895 - Tanzania
 Danae weisei Strohecker, 1954 - DR Congo

References

Further reading

 
 
 

Endomychidae
Coccinelloidea genera